Sporting Memories Network CIC is a UK registered social enterprise that runs community-wide sports reminiscence projects. These projects (provided by the "Sporting Memories Network CIC") introduce the use of archival sports images, reports, and memorabilia. It works in conjunction with a registered charity – The Sporting Memories Foundation that trains and supports volunteers to deliver sports reminiscence in England and Wales.

Start up 
Founded in 2011, Sporting Memories Network Community Interest Company (CIC) ran an initial pilot project with fifteen care homes in Leeds, to test and refine their approach. The project, funded by Skills for Care, was evaluated by Dr Michael Clark, Research Programme Manager, Personal Social Services Research Unit, London School of Economics. The project tested the effectiveness of training care staff and sought to engage relatives, volunteers, and more able residents in facilitating group activities. After receiving background training, each home was supplied with archival images and a training manual. They also received a weekly sports reminiscence newspaper called The Sporting Pink. In his evaluation report, Dr Clark wrote: "The Sporting Memories work is appealing to people (staff and residents) and draws out enthusiasm and personal information that would otherwise have been dormant".

Enthusiasm for an idea is important if it is to be widely used and effective. Training people in approaches which they do not believe in means that either the intervention will not be used, or will be used unenthusiastically. Consequently, it is unlikely to benefit anyone. By tapping into widespread enthusiasm for, and connections with, sports, "Sporting Memories" can be inspirational both to care home staff and to residents. In addition, the training can be readily passed on, and used in a flexible, creative and sustainable manner. The materials can be used many times and adapted to the interests of residents over time. Those who had experienced it reported that they would continue to use the work in their homes.

The network also works with professional sports clubs by raising awareness of dementia through scheduled league matches which are designated Memories Games. This aspect of the Sporting Memories Network work was acknowledged in the first annual report on the progress of the Prime Minister's challenge on dementia and their work with Everton Football Club was published as an example of best practice in the Alzheimer's Society 2013 report on Creating Dementia-Friendly Communities

The majority of the group activities utilize reminiscence therapy which is widely recognized as having a beneficial effect on people living with dementia, memory problems or depression. As identified in a study by Tolson et al. (2012), the use of football as a subject may be more attractive to older men living with dementia than traditional topics covered in reminiscence sessions or group activities. In the Journal of Dementia Care, North Berwick Day Centre manager Carol Wicker reported: "A lot of men attend our day center and most of the staff and volunteers here are women. We try to find ways of engaging with men but it can be difficult to interact meaningfully and get to know people." The Sporting Memories Network has developed activities around many different sports, including Football, Cricket, Rugby, Golf, Tennis, and Motorsport.

There are community projects run by the network in England, Wales, and Scotland which are volunteer-led. Premier League, Football League, Super League, and County Cricket Clubs are involved in hosting and running some of the groups. Other venues include libraries, museums, social clubs, and pubs.

The network has gained the support of current and former sports stars including: David Coulthard, Ross Brawn and Nico Rosberg from Formula One; and footballers Robbie Savage, Chris Kamara and Nigel Martyn. Sporting bodies, such as the Professional Footballers' Association, and the British Racing Drivers' Club, are also supporting the work.

Each supporter has appeared on the network's website and shared their own favourite memories contributing to the 'memory bank' on the company's Replay Websites. In turn, these are used by group facilitators.

On 3 June 2014, the use of sporting memories was featured by BBC Radio 4 All in the Mind. Presented by Claudia Hammond, the programme interviewed gentlemen participating in a weekly sporting memories group in East Lothian. The gentlemen spoke of their experiences in the group, their own health issues, and the impact the group has had on them.Link It also featured on the lunchtime interview on Test Match Special, alongside former South African cricketer Mike Procter, during the second day of the first test match England v India on 10 July 2014 – Link

Awards

On 20 May 2014, Sporting Memories Network CIC was presented the award for "Best National Dementia Friendly Initiative" by Secretary of State for Health, Jeremy Hunt.

On 7 September 2014, Sporting Memories Network CIC appeared in the list of Britain's Top 50 New Radicals. The list was compiled by Nesta and The Observer newspaper and featured organisations or individuals using innovative approaches to tackle social challenges.

On 6 November 2014, Sporting Memories Network CIC was voted "Best Football Community Scheme" at the Football Business Awards. The shortlist consisted of Football Community Trusts from the following football clubs: Charlton Athletic, Chelsea Football Club, Crystal Palace, Everton, Fulham FC, Liverpool FC, Sunderland AFC, West Bromwich Albion, and Sporting Memories Network CIC

Memory Games 
Sporting Memories Network has raised awareness of dementia at a number of professional football league, premier league, and super league clubs. Memories games to unite fans who share their own favourite memories of supporting their club. The games engage current and former players and club staff in the build-up to the games. These are usually scheduled league matches. Information about dementia and memory problems is made available to fans through various channels. The first memory game to raise awareness of dementia took place at Huddersfield Town.

Memories games have taken place at:

 Huddersfield Town v Derby County-15 September 2012 Football League Championship
 Huddersfield Giants v Bradford Bulls- 3 March 2013 Super League
 Everton v Stoke City- 30 March 2013 Premiership
 Warrington Wolves v Hull FC- 17 May 2013
 Grimsby Town v Kidderminster Harriers- 19 December 2013
 Bristol City v Preston North End- 5 April 2014
 Bristol Rugby v London Welsh- 18 April 2014
 Gloucestershire County Cricket Club v Middlesex- 23 May 2014
 Warrington Wolves v Leeds Rhinos- 30 May 2014
 MCC v Hertfordshire- 22 June 2014    *Match played to mark the 200th Anniversary of Lord's Cricket Ground
 Gloucestershire County Cricket Club v Surrey- 18 July 2014
 Salford City v Class of 92- 7 August 2014
 England v India One day International- 25 August 2014
 York City Knights v London Skolars- 7 September 2014
 Wigan Athletic v Fulham- 1 November 2014

References

Further reading 
 Official website
 How sport helps us hit Alzheimer's for six. Daily Telegraph 19 May 2014
 How digital technology is supporting people living with dementia Shirley Ayres blog for Nominet Trust, October 2013
 Let's talk about tech – BBC Radio5live Saturday Edition. 21 September 2013 Chris Warburton discusses the Sporting Memories Network's use of social media with director Tony Jameson-Allen
 Sporting memories – celebrating World Alzheimer's Day 21 September 2013 Sport and Recreation Alliance Website 20 September 2013
 How football is helping unlock dementia patients' memories. The Guardian 10 September 2013
 Everton's pioneering trips down memory lane. The Independent on Sunday 17 February 2013
 How encouraging elderly to recall favorite sporting moments can help in battle against dementia The Daily Telegraph 24 October 2012
 BBC Radio World Service World Football programme BBC World Service World Football September 2012 (hosted by Alan Green)
 ACDC Star supports tiny dementia charity NME News 28 October 2014

Old age in the United Kingdom